Hume's whitethroat (Curruca althaea) is a species of typical warbler. Until recently, it was considered conspecific with the lesser whitethroat as some authorities now reinstate. These are seen as members of a superspecies which also includes the desert whitethroat. The present species together with the aridland desert whitethroat(s) seems to form an Asian lineage in the superspecies.

It is distinguished from the lesser whitethroat by its slightly larger size (13–14 cm), slightly stouter bill, and the darker top of the head and darker grey-brown back, which gives it less contrast between its upper head to back region than in lesser whitethroat. The throat is white, and the rest of the underparts pale greyish-white. Their breeding ranges do not overlap; Hume's whitethroat inhabits upland regions from eastern Iran eastwards to the Tian Shan mountains of central Asia and the western ranges of the Himalaya. Hume's whitethroat breeds at altitudes of 2,000–3,600 m in open scrub, often with juniper, and in cultivated areas such as almond orchards. It migrates south to southern Pakistan and India in the winter, where it does overlap with wintering lesser whitethroats in some areas.

Two subspecies are accepted:
 Curruca althaea – mountains of southwestern Asia.
 Curruca althaea monticola – Alai, Pamir and Tian Shan mountains, in central Asia.

Birds breeding in the Caucasus Mountains and northwestern Iran have sometimes been considered intermediate between lesser and Hume's whitethroats, but are now more clearly assigned to lesser whitethroat, as the subspecies Sylvia curruca caucasica or even not separated from typical European S. c. curruca.

The name commemorates the British naturalist Allan Octavian Hume who worked in India.

References

Gallery

Hume's whitethroat
Birds of Central Asia
Hume's whitethroat
Taxobox binomials not recognized by IUCN